= Wil-Mar Park =

Neighborhood in Concord, North Carolina

Wil-Mar Park is a neighborhood in the town of Concord, North Carolina. It was named by a contest entry for William Propst, and his wife Margaret. It originally stretched 140 acres along North Church Street in 1937. Most of the houses within the neighborhood were built in the 1940s, and included American Colonial revival architecture as well as the American Craftsman style.
